Yvette Thuis (born 23 May 1971) is a former synchronized swimmer from Aruba. She competed in the women's solo and women's duet at the 1988 Summer Olympics.

References 

1971 births
Living people
Aruban synchronized swimmers
Olympic synchronized swimmers of Aruba
Synchronized swimmers at the 1988 Summer Olympics
Dutch sportswomen